Mumbai, the commercial and financial capital of India, has the highest number of skyscrapers and high-rise buildings in India. More than 200 skyscrapers and 4,000 high-rise buildings have already been constructed in the city of Mumbai. (A skyscraper  is defined as a continuously habitable high-rise building that has over 40 floors and is taller than approximately 150 m or 492 ft according to international standards.)

After a significant lull, construction projects since the mid-1990s began taking the skyline upwards, with a major acceleration in the pace of development since 2000, when the Lower Parel area began developing. Palais Royale structurally topped out in 2018 and is the tallest building in the country with a height of 320 meters.

List of tallest buildings in Mumbai 
This list ranks the tallest completed and topped out buildings in Mumbai that stand at least  as of March 2023. This includes spires and architectural details but does not include antenna masts.

Tallest under construction
This lists ranks the 262 buildings that are under construction in Mumbai and are planned to rise at least  or 40 floors tall. Proposed buildings are not included in this table.

On-hold, approved and proposed 

This list ranks buildings that were once under construction and are now on-hold and are planned to rise at least  or 40 floors tall.

Approved, proposed 
This list ranks buildings that are approved or proposed and are planned to rise at least  or 50 floors tall. There are innumerable buildings that are 50 floors approved or proposed in Mumbai. Buildings over 50 floors are proposed in Mumbai Metropolitan Region on a daily basis. So only those buildings that have made significant progress are included in the list.

Timeline of tallest buildings of Mumbai

See also

 List of tallest buildings in India
List of tallest buildings in Chennai
 List of tallest buildings in Navi Mumbai

References

External links
 CTBUH Mumbai
 Diagram of India's skyscrapers - current, proposed, and under construction

Tallest buildings in Mumbai
Mumbai
Tallest buildings in Mumbai